Gauri Lankesh (29 January 1962 – 5 September 2017) was an Indian activist and journalist from Bangalore, Karnataka. She worked as an editor in Lankesh Patrike, a Kannada weekly started by her father P. Lankesh, and ran her own weekly called Gauri Lankesh Patrike. She was assassinated outside her home in Rajarajeshwari Nagar on 5 September 2017. At the time of her death, Gauri was known for being a critic of right-wing Hindu extremism. She was honoured with Anna Politkovskaya Award for speaking against right-wing Hindu extremism, campaigning for women's rights and opposing caste based discrimination.

Early life and career  

Gauri Lankesh was born in a Kannada Lingayat family on 29 January 1962. Her father is the poet-journalist P. Lankesh, who established the Kannada-language weekly tabloid Lankesh Patrike. She had two siblings, Kavitha and Indrajit.

Gauri started her career as a journalist with The Times of India in Bangalore. Later, she moved to Delhi with her husband, Chidanand Rajghatta. Shortly after, she returned to Bangalore, where she worked as a correspondent for the Sunday magazine for nine years. At the time of her father's death in 2000, she was working for the Eenadu'''s Telugu television channel in Delhi. By this time, she had spent 16 years of her life as a journalist.

 Lankesh Patrike 

When their father P. Lankesh died, Gauri and her brother Indrajit visited Mani, the publisher of Lankesh Patrike, and told him that they wanted to cease the publication. Mani convinced them against the idea. Gauri then became the editor of Lankesh Patrike, while her brother Indrajit handled the publication's business affairs.

Beginning in 2001, differences developed between Gauri and Indrajit over the paper's ideology. These differences became public in February 2005, when a report about a Naxalite attack on policemen, approved by Gauri, was published in the magazine. On 13 February, Indrajit (who was the paper's proprietor and publisher) withdrew the report, alleging that it favored the Naxals. On 14 February, Indrajit filed a police complaint against Gauri, accusing her of stealing a computer, printer, and scanner from the publication's office. Gauri filed a counter-complaint, accusing Indrajit of threatening her with a revolver. On 15 February, Indrajit held a press conference, where he accused Gauri of promoting Naxalism through the paper. Gauri held a separate press conference where she denied the accusation and stated that her brother was opposed to her social activism. Gauri subsequently started her own Kannada weekly called Gauri Lankesh Patrike.

 Political views and ideology 

Gauri was a staunch critic of right-wing Hindutva politics.Rollo Romig, "Railing against right-wing Nationalism was a calling, it was also a death sentence. How the journalist Gauri Lankesh became a casualty of India's increasingly intolerant politics", in The New York Times, 14 March 2019. Retrieved 15 March 2019. In 2003, she opposed the Sangh Parivar's alleged attempts to Hinduise the Sufi shrine Guru Dattatreya Baba Budan Dargah located at Baba Budan giri. In 2012, while participating in a protest demanding a ban on communal groups in Mangalore, she stated that Hinduism was not a religion but a "system of hierarchy in society" in which "women are treated as second-class creatures". She endorsed a minority religion tag for the Lingayat community and headed the Komu Souharda Vedike, a communal harmony platform for the oppressed communities. She was also of the view that the followers of philosopher Basavanna were not Hindus.

Gauri was known for advocating freedom of the press. She had written about the wrongdoings of the Indian National Congress leader, D. K. Shivakumar, a close associate of the former Chief Minister of Karnataka, S. M. Krishna. She was opposed to the Bharatiya Janata Party (BJP) and ended her 35-year-old friendship with Prakash Belawadi when the latter became a media advisor to the BJP during the 2014 Indian general election. In November 2014, the Congress-led Karnataka government appointed Gauri as a member of a committee aimed at convincing the Naxalites to give up violence and surrender. However, a delegation of BJP leaders accused her of being a Naxalite sympathiser and demanded her removal from the committee. The chief minister Siddaramaiah rejected the demand.

Gauri was openly critical of the caste system. In 2015, some Brahmins accused her of criticising the novelist S. L. Bhyrappa and Brahminism during the 81st Kannada Sahitya Sammelana (Kannada literary conference) held at Shravanabelagola. At the conference, Gauri remarked that the low-caste author Perumal Murugan was criticised by right-wing Hindu groups for depicting a childless Hindu couple who indulged in consensual sex rituals outside of marriage to have children in his book One Part Woman. She then pointed out that the Brahmin novelist S. L. Bhyrappa had also depicted the similar Niyoga practice in his novel Parva, a retelling of the Hindu epic Mahabharata. She clarified that she was supportive of both these writers, and asked why the Hindu groups who were offended by Perumal Murugan were not offended by Bhyrappa. On 19 February 2015, protesters from the Hassan Zilla Brahmin Sabha ("Hassan district Brahmin Association") organised a rally against her, urging the police to register a First Information Report against her.

 Defamation conviction in 2016 
On 23 January 2008, Gauri published an article titled "Darodegilada BJP galu" in her newspaper. The article criticised the BJP leaders Pralhad Joshi, Umesh Dushi, Shivanand Bhat, and Venkatesh Mestry. It also stated that the jeweller sought justice from Member of Parliament Joshi and threatened to approach the police should Joshi refuse to help him. Gauri later said that the article was based on "sources within the BJP".

Joshi and Dushi filed separate defamation suits against Gauri. In Dushi's case, she was a co-accused with Devanand Jagapur, the writer of the article.

Gauri stated that she was being targeted for her left-leaning political views, as the BJP leaders did not sue other local dailies who had published the same allegations. Gauri moved the case to the High Court, seeking dismissal of the case against her. However, in 2016, the High Court refused to dismiss the case and gave instructions for the hearing to be continued in the lower court. The High Court granted a four-week stay on the case, however, and directed the lower court to complete the trial within six months.

In October 2016, the second Judicial Magistrate First Class (JMFC) Court at Hubli issued an arrest warrant for Gauri after she failed to appear before the court and did not respond to earlier warrants. The police detained her and produced her before the court on 1 October 2016.

On 27 November 2016, the second JMFC court concluded that Gauri had failed to provide any substantial evidence for her criticism of the BJP leaders and found her guilty of defamation. Her co-accused, Devanand Jagapur, was acquitted by the same court. The same court granted her anticipatory bail, however, which made her avoid prison time.

Gauri stated that the BJP leaders had managed to cover their tracks by reaching a compromise with the jeweler; she refused to disclose her source for the corruption allegations against them. She also described the court verdict as a temporary setback and declared that she would challenge it in the higher court.

 Personal life 

Gauri and Chidanand Rajghatta divorced after five years of marriage; she remained single after the separation. Although she lived alone and did not have any children, she considered the activists Jignesh Mevani, Kanhaiya Kumar, Umar Khalid and Shehla Rashid Shora as her "adopted children" metaphorically.

 Death 

On 5 September 2017, Gauri died after being shot by three unidentified men at her house in Rajarajeshwari Nagar, Bangalore. The men fired at least seven bullets at her at around 8 p.m. while she was unlocking the main door of her house after returning from her office. One of the killers, who was waiting for her near her house, fired the first shots at her, while the two others, who are suspected to have followed her from her office, joined the initial shooter thereafter. The killers were wearing helmets and escaped on a two-wheeler Honda Dio after the murder. Three of the bullets pierced Gauri's head, neck, and chest, resulting in her death at the scene.

 Reactions 
The murder was condemned by several people and organisations, including the Indian National Congress and the Rashtriya Swayamsevak Sangh. The Congress leader and Karnataka Home Minister Ramalinga Reddy compared the murder to that of Narendra Dabholkar and M. M. Kalburgi. Controversial statements by BJP MLA D. N. Jeevaraj and Sri Ram Sena chief Pramod Muthalik were widely criticized. The state police chief, R. K. Dutta, refused to suggest any possible suspects without investigation. BJP leaders criticised the Congress-led state government for allegedly failing to protect the lives of Gauri and other writers like Kalburgi. Protests over her death took place all across India, including a rally in Bangalore a week after the funeral attended by more than 25,000 people.

Gauri was given a state funeral with a gun salute on 6 September, after her body was kept for a few hours at Ravindra Kalakshetra for the public to pay tribute. She was buried in accordance with Lingayat customs. Her family did not follow any religious customs for her as she identified as a rationalist. The BBC described it as the most high-profile journalist murdered in recent years.

The New York Times reported that several accounts followed by right-wing prime minister Narendra Modi had posted "hateful" tweets in response to Lankesh's assassination, prompting a debate in India.

 Investigation 

During their investigation, the police accessed CCTV footage from her residence and the route leading from Basavanagudi to her house. The city was kept on high alert the day after her death, with police being deployed at toll gates in Nelamangala, Hosur Road and NICE Road in search of the killers. Vehicles entering or exiting the city underwent stringent checks, while police in the neighbouring states of Andhra Pradesh, Maharashtra and Tamil Nadu were also alerted.

In 2018, the Special Investigation Team (SIT) probing the murder case detained two suspects, whom they also suspected of being involved in the murders of Dabholkar and Kalburgi. In June 2018, the SIT stated that Parashuram Waghmore had confessed to the murder: he claimed that he was told to kill someone to save his religion, and that he did not know who the victim was.
In September 2018, Maharashtra ATS detained 2 suspects related to her murder and also recovered cache of arms from them. A March 2019 New York Times article on Gauri Lankesh includes a discussion of the police investigation and murder charges. Her relatives and friends discuss the investigation in a podcast published by openDemocracy in January 2022.

On 11 August 2022, the special court for Karnataka Control of Organised Crime examined three more witnesses, including two policemen, in the murder trial.

In popular culture

The assassination is featured along with assassinations of other rationalists such as Narendra Dabholkar, M. M. Kalburgi and Govind Pansare in the documentary mini-series Vivek-Reason by Anand Patwardhan.

Legacy
Gauri Lankesh is seen as an important figure for people who are protesting against rightward shift in the governance, for instance on her third death anniversary several journalists and activists participated in #IfWeDoNotRise campaign in her memory and in wake of arrests of dissidents across the nation.

In 2021, Burnaby, a Canadian city decided to celebrate Gauri Lankesh Day on September 5 to commemorate her on her death anniversary.

In 2023, "Forbidden Stories pursued Lankesh’s work on fake news and explored new leads in her murder case" as part of the case series Story Killers''.

See also

List of women killed fighting for human rights

Notes and references 

1962 births
2017 deaths
Murdered Indian journalists
Writers from Bangalore
Kannada-language writers
Indian women journalists
Journalists from Karnataka
Indian activist journalists
Indian feminists
Indian rationalists
Deaths by firearm in India
Journalists killed in India
Women writers from Karnataka
20th-century Indian journalists
21st-century Indian journalists
20th-century Indian women writers
21st-century Indian women writers
Assassinated Indian journalists
2017 murders in India
Hate crimes in India